Billel Dib (born on 26 May 1989) is an Australian professional boxer who has held the WBA Oceania super-featherweight title since 2018, and now also holds the International Boxing Federation Australasian super featherweight title. Billel Dib has held many titles such as the Australian title 2 times and the World Boxing Organization Oriental titles.

Early life and education 
Dib was born in Sydney, New South Wales, on 26 May 1989, into a Lebanese-Australian family. His parents emigrated to Australia from Lebanon. He was raised on the Gold Coast, Queensland, and graduated from Benowa State High School in 2006. He currently resides on the Gold Coast and travels to Sydney regularly for training camp, and to continue his commitments as a student of Accounting at the University of Western Sydney. His brother, Ahmed 'Dynamite' Dib is also a professional boxer.

Professional career

Australia 
Dib's professional career commenced in January 2011 when he debuted against Jayson Mac Gura on the Gold Coast, Australia. Dib won and went on to win the next seven bouts before suffering his first loss in October 2012, when Dib lost his claim to the Australian super-featherweight title against Dylan Sendeckyj by way of a split decision. In June 2013, Dib avenged the loss against Sendeckyj to capture the Australian title, winning by way of knockout. In May 2014, Dib won the WBO Oriental interim super-featherweight title against Brett Elliot in Sydney, Australia. In April 2015, Dib won the same title for a second time, against Bebong Manalo.

United States 
Dib signed with Probox Management in February 2016, and went on to win his first international bout in April 2016 against Jose Salinas by way of majority decision. Chief executive officer and co-founder of Probox Management, Garry Jonas, has expressed that Dib "has all the characteristics that [Pro Box Management] look for. He is a hard worker, well spoken, good looking action fighting young man, who is very marketable. We definitely think he can be a significant world champion sometime soon."

Professional boxing record

Boxing titles 
 x2 Australian Super Featherweight Title;
 World Boxing Organisation (WBO) Oriental Champion;
 World Boxing Association (WBA) Oceania Champion
International Boxing Federation (IBF) Australasian Champion

Personal life 
Dib is a self-identified devout Muslim, and was raised in a Muslim-Australian household. He is involved in community work with Islamic Care, supporting social workers in disability centres in Lebanon for Lebanese, Palestinian and Syrian disabled refugees.

References 

1989 births
Living people
Australian male boxers
Australian Muslims
Australian people of Lebanese descent
Sportspeople of Lebanese descent
Boxers from Sydney
Super-featherweight boxers